Beer glassware comprise vessels made of glass, designed or commonly used for serving and drinking beer. Styles of glassware vary in accord with national or regional traditions; legal or customary requirements regarding serving measures and fill lines; such practicalities as breakage avoidance in washing, stacking or storage; commercial promotion by breweries; artistic or cultural expression in folk art or as novelty items or usage in drinking games; or to complement, to enhance, or to otherwise affect a particular type of beer's temperature, appearance and aroma, as in the case of its head.
Drinking vessels intended for beer are made from a variety of materials other than glass, including pottery, pewter, and wood.

International styles

Pilsner glass

A pilsner glass is used for many types of light beers, including pale lager or pilsner. In Europe,  glasses are also common. They are tall, slender and tapered. The slender glass reveals the colour, and carbonation of the beer, and the broad top helps maintain a beer head.

Weizen glasses are sometimes mistakenly called pilsner glasses because they are somewhat similar in appearance, but true pilsner glasses have an even taper without any amount of curvature.

Pint glass

The definition of a pint differs by country, thus a pint glass will reflect the regular measure of beer in that country. In the UK, law stipulates that a serving of beer be fixed at the imperial pint (568 ml ≈ 1.2 US pints). Quarter-pint glasses of  also exist, and are popular in Australia (now 140 ml from metrication), where they are known as a "pony". These may simply be smaller pint glasses, or may be a special pony glass. Glasses of 500 ml are usually called pints in American parlance.

The common shapes of pint glass are:
The nonic, a variation on the conical design, where the glass bulges out a couple of inches from the top; this is partly for improved grip, partly to prevent the glasses from sticking together when stacked, and partly to give strength and stop the rim from becoming chipped or "nicked". The term "nonic" derives from "no nick".
Jug glasses, or "dimple mugs", are shaped more like a large mug with a handle. They are moulded with a grid pattern of thickened glass on the outside, somewhat resembling the segmentation of a WWII-era hand grenade. The dimples prevent the glass slipping out of the fingers in a washing-up bowl, and the design of the glass emphasises strength, also to withstand frequent manual washing. These design features became less important when manual washing was superseded by machine washing from the 1960s onwards. Dimpled glasses are now rarer than the other types and are regarded as more traditional. This sort of glass is also known as a "Handle" due to the handle on the glass. They are popular with the older generation and people with restricted movement in their hands which can make holding a usual pint glass difficult. They have recently started to make a renaissance, especially in northern Britain.

Connoisseur's glassware
Beer connoisseurs sometimes invest in special, non-traditional glassware to enhance their appreciation. An example was the range marketed by Michael "Beer Hunter" Jackson.

Snifters

Typically used for serving brandy and cognac, a snifter is ideal for capturing the volatiles of aromatic beers such as Double/Imperial IPAs, Belgian ales, barley wines and wheat wines. The shape helps trap the volatiles, while allowing swirling to agitate them and produce an intense aroma.

Taster glasses
Glasses holding 1/3 of a pint or less may be used to:
Try a beer in a pub or café before purchasing a full measure
Split a bottle of rare or strong beer between friends
Sample multiple beers without becoming inebriated. For instance a brewpub might provide a sampler of three different brews in  pint measures; or a beer festival might provide small capacity glasses for patrons.

Plastic
Plastic beer vessels are usually shaped in imitation of whichever glasses are usual in the locality. They are mainly used as a substitute for glass vessels where breakages would be particularly problematic or likely, for instance at outdoor events.

German, Austrian, and Swiss styles

glasses

A  glass is used to serve wheat beer. Originating in Germany, the glass is narrow at the bottom and slightly wider at the top; the width both releasing aroma, and providing room for the often thick, fluffy heads produced by wheat beer. It tends to be taller than a pint glass, and generally holds  with room for foam or "head".

Wheat beers tend to foam a lot, especially if poured quickly. In pubs, if the bottle is handed to the patron for self pouring, it is customary for the glass to be taken to the patron wet or with a bit of water in the bottom to be swirled around to wet the entire glass to keep the beer from foaming excessively.

Beer stein
Beer stein or simply "stein" has been for over a century an English expression for a traditional German beer mug made out of stoneware, whether simple and serviceably sturdy, or elaborately ornamental with either a traditionally cultural theme, or so embellished as to be sold as a souvenir or a collectible.  The former may be made out of stoneware, but rarely the inferior earthenware or wood, while the latter is usually of glazed pottery, but often porcelain or pewter, or even silver or crystal. It may have either an uncovered mouth or a hinged pewter lid with a thumb-lever. The capacity of a German "stein" indicated by its fill line on its side ranged from "0.4l" (4 deci-litre), through "0.5l" (half a litre) or a full litre (or comparable historic sizes). Like decorative tankards, steins are often decorated in a culturally nostalgic, often German or Bavarian, theme. Some believe the lid that excludes flies from the beer today was originally intended for those so diseased in the age of the Black Plague.

Maßkrug

The Maß is a  quantity of beer, most commonly used in Bavaria and Austria. It is served in a Maßkrug (pl. Maßkrüge), which is sometimes simply referred to as a Maß. The unit of volume is typically used only for measuring beer sold for immediate on-site consumption. Because the Maß is a unit of measure, it can come in the form of a glass or stoneware mug.

The endurance sport of Maßkrugstemmen involves holding a filled,  Maß at arm's length. The world record is 45minutes and 2seconds.

Willi Becher

The Willi Becher glass is common in Germany. It is characterized by its shape: conical to the top portion where it curves inward to converge back to the top of a smaller diameter opening.

Beer boot

Boot- and shoe-shaped drinking vessels have been found at archaeological sites dating back to the bronze-age Urnfield cultures. Modern beer boots (or ) have over a century of history and culture behind them. It is commonly believed that a general somewhere promised his troops to drink beer from his boot if they were successful in battle. When the troops prevailed, the general had a glassmaker fashion a boot from glass to fulfill his promise without tasting his own feet and to avoid spoiling the beer in his leather boot. Since then, soldiers have enjoyed toasting to their victories with a beer boot. At gatherings in Germany, Austria and Switzerland, beer boots are often passed among the guests for a festive drinking challenge. Since the movie Beerfest premiered in 2006, beer boots have become increasingly popular in the United States.

It is an old joke to hand the boot to a young novice drinker with the toe pointing away from his person, which will result in beer pouring over the drinker's face uncontrollably when air enters the toe; seasoned drinkers always point the toe towards their body until the glass is sufficiently drained.

Pilstulpe

The Pilstulpe ("Pilsner Tulip") or Biertulpe ("Beer tulip") is the traditional glass used for German pilsner beers. When used in restaurant settings, a small piece of absorbent paper is placed around the base to absorb any drips from spilling or condensation.

Gallery

Belgian and Dutch styles

Stronger or bottled beers are frequently served in specially-made, elaborately-branded glassware. In addition to the profusion of glasses provided by brewers, some Belgian beer cafés serve beer in their own "house" glassware.

Flute glass
A vessel similar to a champagne flute is the preferred serving vessel for Belgian lambics and fruit beers. The narrow shape helps maintain carbonation, while providing a strong aromatic front. Flute glasses display the lively carbonation, sparkling color, and soft lacing of this distinct style.

Goblet or Chalice
Chalices and goblets are large, stemmed, bowl-shaped glasses adequate for serving heavy Belgian ales, German bocks, and other big sipping beers. The distinction between goblet and chalice is typically in the glass thickness.  Goblets tend to be thick, while the chalice is thin walled. Some chalices are even etched on the bottom to nucleate a stream of bubbles for maintaining a nice head.

Tulip glass
A tulip glass has a shape similar to a brandy snifter.  The body is bulbous, like a snifter, but the top flares out to form a lip which helps head retention. It is recommended for serving Scottish ales, American double/imperial IPAs, barley wines, Belgian ales and other aromatic beers. Some pint glasses that taper outwards towards the top are also called tulip glasses, despite having noticeably less curvature.

Gallery

British and Irish styles

Tankard
A tankard is a form of drinkware consisting of a large, roughly cylindrical, drinking cup with a single handle. Tankards are usually made of silver, pewter, or glass, but can be made of other materials, for example wood, ceramic or leather. A tankard may have a hinged lid, and tankards featuring glass bottoms are also fairly common. Tankards are shaped and used similarly to beer steins. Metal tankards were popular in 18th and early 19th century Britain and Ireland, but were largely superseded by glass vessels. They are now seen as collector's items, or may be engraved and presented as a gift.
Wooden and leather tankards were popular before the 17th century, but being made of organic materials have rarely survived intact to the present day.

Yard of ale

The glass most likely originated in 17th-century England where the glass was known also as a "Long Glass", a "Cambridge Yard (Glass)" and an "Ell Glass". It is associated by legend with stagecoach drivers, though was mainly used for drinking feats and special toasts. (Compare with the Pauwel Kwak glass).

Drinking a yard glass full of beer is a traditional pub game. The fastest drinking of a yard of ale in the Guinness Book of Records is 5 seconds.

Capacity

Australian measures 

Prior to metrication in Australia, one could buy beer in glasses of size 4, 5, 6, 7, 10, 15 or 20 imperial fluid ounces. Each sized glass had a different name in each Australian state. These were replaced by glasses of size 115, 140, 170, 200, 285, 425 and 570 ml. Progressively, the differences are decreasing. In the 21st century, most pubs no longer have a glass smaller than 200 ml (7 imp fl oz); typically available are 200ml, 285ml and 425ml, and increasingly many pubs also have pints  available.

See also

Beer bottle
Beer tower
Beerfest

References

External links

 
Drinking glasses